The Serie B 1961–62 was the thirtieth tournament of this competition played in Italy since its creation.

Teams
Modena, Lucchese and Cosenza had been promoted from Serie C, while Bari, Napoli and Lazio had been relegated from Serie A.

Final classification

Results

References and sources
Almanacco Illustrato del Calcio - La Storia 1898-2004, Panini Edizioni, Modena, September 2005

Serie B seasons
2
Italy